James Henry Miller (born 30 May 1919) is a former Australian rules footballer in the Victorian Football League (VFL). He turned 100 in May 2019.

Miller was born in Melbourne suburb of Footscray and played in the Footscray District Football League until he was recruited by the Footscray Football Club. Miller made his debut for Footscray in 1938 and played 131 games for the club in the next 11 years. During World War II he served in both the army and the RAAF.

He left the VFL in 1948 to join Yarraville Football Club in the Victorian Football Association, where he was captain-coach. He retired from playing in 1949 due to a leg injury.

Miller was made a life member of the Footscray Football Club in 1947. He was a committee member of the club from 1957 and served as president between 1963 and 1966, when he did not stand for re-election, after previously serving as vice-president under Henry Dolphin.

Mark Buttler and Steven Milne named Miller as one of Footscray's best 50 players in their 1994 book, Sons of the 'Scray: Footscray's Finest 50.

References

External links 
Jim Miller's profile at AustralianFootball.com

Jim Miller's playing statistics from The VFA Project

Western Bulldogs players
Yarraville Football Club players
Yarraville Football Club coaches
Royal Australian Air Force personnel of World War II
Australian rules footballers from Melbourne
1919 births
Living people
Australian centenarians
Men centenarians
Australian Army personnel of World War II
People from Footscray, Victoria
Military personnel from Melbourne